Georgios Diamantis was a Greek sport shooter. He competed at the 1896 Summer Olympics in Athens. Diamantis competed in the two rifle events. In the military rifle event, he placed seventh with a score of 1,456. In the second string of ten shots, he scored 384. His score and place in the free rifle event is unknown, except that he did not win a medal.

References

External links 
 

Year of birth missing
Year of death missing
Greek male sport shooters
Olympic shooters of Greece
Shooters at the 1896 Summer Olympics
19th-century sportsmen
Place of birth missing
Place of death missing